Maria von Tasnady (16 November 1911 – 16 March 2001) was a Hungarian singer, stage and film actress. She was born as Mária Tasnádi Fekete and used a variety of other professional names including Maria De Tasnady during her career.

von Tasnady was born to ethnically Hungarian parents in Transylvania when it was still part of the Austro-Hungarian Empire. Following its transfer to Romania after the First World War, she emigrated to Hungary.  
She was the Hungarian entrant at the 1931 Miss Europe contest, losing out to the French winner. Moving to Weimar Germany, she made her film debut in 1932.

von Tasnady appeared in twenty five films during her career. As well as Germany, she also worked in her native Hungary and Italy where she appeared in the patriotic war film Bengasi in 1942. Following the Second World War, she was employed by Radio Free Europe. She was married to the film producer Bruno Duday.

Selected filmography
 When Love Sets the Fashion (1932)
 Final Chord (1936)
 Men Without a Fatherland (1937)
 Woman Without a Past (1939)
 Sarajevo (1940)
 Alarm (1941)
 Bengasi (1942)
 Yellow Hell (1942)
 The Young Caruso (1951)
 André and Ursula (1955)

References

Bibliography
 Gundle, Stephen. Mussolini's Dream Factory: Film Stardom in Fascist Italy. Berghahn Books, 2013.

External links

1911 births
2001 deaths
People from Petrila
Hungarian film actresses
Hungarian stage actresses
20th-century Hungarian women singers
Hungarian emigrants to Germany
Hungarian beauty pageant winners